Njabulo Ndlovu (born 29 December 1994) is a Swazi footballer who plays for Mbabane Swallows F.C.

International career

International goals
Scores and results list eSwatini's goal tally first.

References

External links 
 

1994 births
Living people
Swazi footballers
Eswatini international footballers
Association football midfielders
Mbabane Swallows players